The Campeonato Capixaba Série B  is the second tier of football league of the state of Espírito Santo, Brazil.

List of champions

Titles by team 

Teams in bold still active.

By city

References

 
Football competitions in Espírito Santo
Capixaba